Humberview Secondary School (formerly The Humberview School, or Humberview Senior Public School) is a high school in Bolton, Caledon, Ontario, Canada. It is one of the four secondary schools in Caledon, the others being Robert F. Hall Catholic Secondary School in Caledon East, Ontario, St. Michael Catholic Secondary School in Bolton, Ontario, and Mayfield Secondary School. The year 2003 was a double cohort year for the school.

Athletics
Humberview Secondary School offers 29 sports and physical activities and has won several Region of Peel Secondary Schools Athletic Association championships in rugby, curling, field hockey, volleyball, soccer, and track and field.

Today, the school still competes at higher levels. The boys' basketball team finished 3rd overall in the Region of Peel, while the girls field hockey team won their division. Other notable mentions include the table tennis team, as well as the track & field team.

The sports and physical activities Humberview offers is: archery, badminton, baseball, basketball, bocce, bowling, cheerleading, cricket, cross country running, curling, Dance Club, flag football, field hockey, frisbee, golf, hockey, Humberview Athletic Council (HAC), lacrosse, rowing, rugby, skiing (alpine), skiing (nordic), soccer, table tennis, tennis, track and field, volleyball, Workout Club, and wrestling.

Robotics 
On September 10th, 2013, Humberview's began a FIRST Robotics Competition team, The Alpha Dogs - Team 4946. The team has won a variety of awards such as winning the Durham College event and being a subdivision finalist in 2017. They have won countless other awards and have won at least 1 award at most competition they attend.

Music
Humberview has boasted a strong music program ever since the first band program was set up in 1981. Since 2013 the program has been led by Mr. Dan Rollings and Ms. Tanya Nelson. The program features an Intermediate Concert Band for grade 9 & 10 students and a Senior Wind Ensemble for grade 11 & 12 students. This  band also serves as the school marching band, often performing at the Bolton Santa Claus Parade. The school vocal jazz ensemble is named Mkosa and the Sr jazz Band is called the Humberview Jazz Orchestra, or more often, Jazzork. When the junior jazz band  runs, it is known as Tonic. The school choir is called Northern Voices.

Over the years these different ensembles have performed in festivals all over North America. The program travels to New York City for a week every other year, including  Spring 2023. Humberview's bands and choirs have performed at Walt Disney World twelve times.

Since the pandemic, Humberview Music has been shifting from its long-standing world percussion program to a new guitar program, featuring solo and ensemble work. The program now also offers a music production program.

Student  social activities are run by the Music Activity Council, or MAC. Since 2013, the MAC presidents have been Samantha Hilton, Mitch Strong, Matthew Strong and Megan Hymers, Matthew Strong, Nicole Nacaratto, Abby Castelucci, Kayla Emmerton, Kelton Hopper and Abby Elliott.

Specialist High Skills Major
Mel Everett, the head of business and technology departments, began the first Peel District School Board SHSM transportation program at Humberview School in 2012. The purpose of the program is to provide students with an opportunity to gain skills that can lead to a career in the transportation industry. The program has begun putting on an annual car show for students to check out different vehicles and meet professionals in the industry.

The first student from the HEALS (Healthy Eating, Active Lifestyle and Sports) SHSM  graduated in 2015 under the leadership of Kent Campbell and the department heads. The program offers opportunities for students to delve into more than just sports future by looking at all aspects of the health and sports care industries.

The latest SHSM offered is the Environmental SHSM. Founded by Andrew Cresswell and Shannon McCauley, the program provides opportunities for students to participate in learning and career exploration opportunities relevant to the sector which include working with a stream restoration specialist on the Humber River, attending the Forests Ontario annual conference, meeting with a researcher at the Honey Bee Centre, or snowshoeing with a naturalist in the Wye Marsh.

Notable students
 Cory Trépanier, artist

 Organik, founder of the King Of The Dot battle rap league.

See also
List of high schools in Ontario
FIRST Robotics

References

External links
 Humberview Secondary School
 Humberview Specialist High Skills Major Transportation
The Alpha Dogs 

Peel District School Board
High schools in Caledon, Ontario
Educational institutions established in 1979
1979 establishments in Ontario